Jacob Gilles (ca. 1691 in Kollum – 10 September 1765 in Ypenburg manor near Rijswijk) was Grand Pensionary of Holland from 23 September 1746 to 18 June 1749.

18th-century Dutch people
1691 births
1765 deaths
Dutch States Party politicians
Grand Pensionaries
People from Kollumerland